The 2016–17 Primera División de Fútbol Profesional season (also known as the Liga Pepsi) is the 18th season and 35th and 36th tournament of El Salvador's Primera División since its establishment of an Apertura and Clausura format. Alianza and Dragón were the defending champions of the Apertura and Clausura, respectively. The league will consist of 12 teams. There will be two seasons conducted under identical rules, with each team playing a home and away game against the other clubs for a total of 22 games per tournament. At the end of each half-season tournament, the top 8 teams in that tournament's regular season standings will take part in the playoffs.

The champions of Apertura or Clausura with the better aggregate record will qualify for the 2018 CONCACAF Champions League. The other champion, and the runner-up with the better aggregate record will qualify for the 2017 CONCACAF League.  Should the same team win both tournaments, both runners-up will qualify for CONCACAF League.  Should the final of both tournaments features the same 2 teams, the semifinalist with the better aggregate record will qualify for CONCACAF League.

Team information 

A total of 12 teams will contest the league, including 11 sides from the 2015–16 Primera División and 1 promoted from the 2015–16 Segunda División.

C.D. Atlético Marte were relegated to 2016–17 Segunda División the previous season.

The relegated team was replaced by the 2015–16 Segunda División playoffs promotion winner. C.D. Municipal Limeño won the Apertura 2015 and Clausura 2016 title, meaning there was no need for a promotion playoff and were promoted automatically.

Promotion and relegation 

Promoted from Segunda División de Fútbol Salvadoreño as of June, 2016.

 Champions: C.D. Municipal Limeño

Relegated to Segunda División de Fútbol Salvadoreño as of June, 2016.

 Last Place: Atlético Marte

Stadia and locations

Personnel and sponsoring

Managerial changes

Before the start of the season

During the Apertura season

Between Apertura and Clausura seasons

During the Clausura season

Apertura 2016

League table

Results

Scoring 

 First goal of the season:  Guillermo Stradella for C.D. FAS against UES, 21 minutes (July 29, 2016)
 First goal by a foreign player:  Guillermo Stradella for C.D. FAS against UES, 21 minutes (July 29, 2016)
 Fastest goal in a match: 2 minutes
  Eder Arias for C.D. Chalatenango against Metapán (August 16, 2016)
 Goal scored at the latest point in a match: 90+1 minutes
  Jonathan Águila for C.D. FAS against UES (July 29, 2016)
 First penalty Kick of the season:  TBD for TBD against TBD, 89 minutes (August 3, 2016)
 Widest winning margin: 4 goals
 Alianza F.C. 4–0 C.D. Chalatenango (2016)
 Águila 5-1 UES (2016)
 First hat-trick of the season:  Ricardo Brown for Metapán against C.D. Pasaquina (September 28, 2016)
 First own goal of the season:  Kevin Carabantes  (C.D. Chalatenango) for A.D. Isidro Metapán (August 16, 2016)
 Most goals in a match: 7 goals
 C.D. Chalatenango 3–4 C.D. Dragón (September 28, 2016)
 Most goals by one team in a match: 5 goals
 Águila 5-1 UES (2016)
 Most goals in one half by one team: 4 goals
 TBD 5–2(1–2) TBD (2nd half, September 30, 2016)
 Most goals scored by losing team: 3 goals
 C.D. Chalatenango 3–4 C.D. Dragón (September 28, 2016)
 Most goals by one player in a single match: 3 goals
  Ricardo Brown for Metapán against C.D. Pasaquina (September 17, 2016)
  Gustavo Guerreño for Pasaquina against C.D. Universidad de El Salvador (September 2016)
   Williams Reyes for Firpo against C.D. Pasaquina (October 9, 2016)
  Sebastián Abreu for Santa Tecla F.C. against C.D. Águila (December 7, 2016)

Club 

 Most clean sheets: C.D. Águila
 11
 Fewest clean sheets: UES
 1
 Best Home record during the Apertura season: Sonsonate
 23 out of 33 points (7 wins, 2 draws, and 2 loss)
 Worst Home record during the Apertura season: Dragón and UES
 6 out of 33 points (1 win, 3 draws, and 7 losses)
 Best Away record during the Apertura season: Águila
 20 out of 33 points (5 wins, 5 draws, and 1 losses)
 Worst Away record during the Apertura season: UES
 6 out of 33 points (1 win, 3 draws, and 7 losses)
 Highest scoring team: Alianza
 45 goals
 Lowest scoring team: UES
 48 goals

Top goalscorers

Top assists

Individual awards

Playoffs

Quarterfinals

First leg

Second leg 

2–2. Sonsonate advanced as the higher seeded team.

Águila won 3–1 on aggregate.

2–2. Alianza advanced as the higher seeded team.

Santa Tecla won 3–2 on aggregate.

Semifinals

First leg

Second leg 

Alianza won 4–0 on aggregate.

Santa Tecla won 4–3 on aggregate.

Final

Clausura 2017

League table

Results

Scoring 
 First goal of the season:  Erick Villalobos for C.D. Pasaquina against Alianza, 35 minutes (January 14, 2017)
 First goal by a foreign player:  Darío Ferreira for Alianza F.C. against Pasaquina, 57 minutes (January 14, 2017)
 Fastest goal in a match: 1 minutes
  Miguel Lemus for Firpo against C.D. Municipal Limeno (2017)
 Goal scored at the latest point in a match: 90+1 minutes
  TBD for TBD against TBD (2017)
 First penalty Kick of the season:   Danilo Peinado for  C.D. Águila against Firpo, 81 minutes (15 January 2017)
 Widest winning margin: 3 goals
 C.D. Aguila 5-2 Firpo (15 January 2017)
 First hat-trick of the season: **  Rodolfo Zelaya for Alianza against Dragon (2 April 2017)
 First own goal of the season:   Bladimir Osorio   (C.D. Dragon) for UES ( 2017)
 Most goals in a match: 7 goals
 C.D. Águila 5-2 Firpo (15 January 2017)
 Most goals by one team in a match: 5 goals
 C.D. Águila 5-2 Firpo (15 January 2017)
 Most goals in one half by one team: 3 goals
 C.D. Águila 3–0 (5–2) Firpo (1st half, 2017)
 Most goals scored by losing team: TBD goals
 TBD 3–4 TBD ( 2017)
 Most goals by one player in a single match: 3 goals
  Rodolfo Zelaya for Alianza against Dragon (2 April 2017)
  Oscar Movil for Limeno against TBD ( April, 2017)

Individual awards

Playoffs

Quarterfinals

First leg

Second leg 

Alianza won 4–0 on aggregate. 

3–3. Aguila advanced as the higher seeded team.

Santa Tecla won 1–0 on aggregate.

2–2. Isidro Metapan advanced as the higher seeded team.

Semifinals

First leg

Second leg 

Alianza won 2–0 on aggregate.

Santa Tecla won 5–2 on aggregate.

Final

List of foreign players in the league 

This is a list of foreign players in the 2016–17 season. The following players:

 Have played at least one game for the respective club.
 Have not been capped for the El Salvador national football team on any level, independently from the birthplace

A new rule was introduced this season, that clubs can have four foreign players per club  and can only add a new player if there is an injury or a player/s is released and its before the close of the season transfer window.

Águila
  Jimmy Valoyes
  James Cabezas
  Ignacio Flores  
  Nicolás Fagúndez
   Danilo Peinado
  Adrián Colazo  

Alianza
  Iván Garrido  
  Oscar Guerrero 
  Luis Hinestroza
  Fabricio Silva
  Wálter Vázquez 
  Gustavo Guerreño 
  Darío Ferreira

Chalatenango
  Bladimir Díaz 
  Eder Arias 
  Rodrigo Cubilla
  Mauricio Mendoza
  Carlos Angulo

Dragón
  Álvaro Bely 
  Kenroy Howell 
  Jamal Jack 
  Luis Valencia 
  Josielson Moraes 
  Marcio Ayala
  Georgie Welcome
  Jackson de Oliveira

FAS
  Guillermo Stradella
  Juan Aimar 
  Facundo Martínez  
  Facundo Simioli 
  Matías Coloca
  Allan Muraldo
  Sandro Medaglia

Firpo 
  Jhony Rios
  Allan Murialdo 
  Maximiliano Morales Roldán 
  Joel Perucci 
  César Iván González
  Pierre Alexandre Pluchino Galuppo
  Thiago Monteiro Accioli Da Silva

Isidro Metapán
  Henry Rúa 
  Romeo Parkes
  Ricardo Brown  
  Akeem Priestley 
  Alexis Ramos
  Ayukokata Ndip

Limeño
  Carlos Del Giorno 
  Jefferson Viveros  
  Clayvin Zúñiga   
  Jesús Toscanini  
   Julio César de León
  Aly Arriola
  Óscar Móvil

Pasaquina
  Julián Chávez Ruíz 
  Gustavo Guerreño 
  Javier Lezcano
  Andrés Britez
  Arlie Bernárdez 
  Dwane James

Sonsonate
  Zé Paulo
  Carlos Hidalgo  
  Jackson de Oliveira   
  Elenilson Ferreira García   
  Josimar Moreira 
  Yosimar Arias  
  Johan Condega 

Santa Tecla
  Ricardinho 
  Joel Almeida
  Sebastián Abreu 
  Oswaldo Alves Da Silva 
  Sergio Souza
   Carlos Bueno

UES
  William Guerrero  
  Mckauly Tulloch  
  Elison dos Santos  
  Weslie John  
  Diego González
  Cristian Gil Mosquera
  Rafael Ponzo
  Lucas Rivero

 (player released during the Apertura season)
 (player released between the Apertura and Clausura seasons)
 (player released during the Clausura season)

Aggregate table

References 

Primera División de Fútbol Profesional seasons
El Salvador
1